Vietnam war refugees refers to people forced to flee from their countries and become refugees in relation to the Vietnam War.

Refugees
 Vietnamese boat people, refugees that fled Vietnam after the Vietnam War.
 Vietnam War resisters in Canada, American refugees who fled to Canada to avoid service in the Vietnam War.
 Vietnam War resisters in Sweden, American refugees who fled to Sweden to avoid service in the Vietnam War.

Events
 Indochina refugee crisis, outflow of refugees due to insurgencies in Indochina.

Vietnam War